Roula Hamadeh (born 31 March 1961) is a prolific Lebanese actress who achieved fame during the 1980s. She portrayed the iconic Jamale Salem in Shukri Anis Fakhoury's Al-`assifa series.

Sources 

1961 births
Living people
Lebanese television actresses
Lebanese film actresses